Astragalus vanillae is a species of milkvetch in the family Fabaceae.

References

vanillae
Taxa named by Pierre Edmond Boissier